Werbe is a river of Hesse, Germany. It flows into the Edersee in Waldeck-Nieder-Werbe.

See also
List of rivers of Hesse

References

Rivers of Hesse
Rivers of Germany